Carizza Cortez-Rkhami (born July 1, 1988 in Taytay, Rizal) is a Filipino actress, comedian, model and endorser.

Life
Carizza Cortez was born on July 1, 1988 in Taytay, Rizal, a densely populated municipality of Rizal. She is the daughter of the actor Rez Cortez.

She took up Theatre Arts at the University of the Philippines-Diliman.

She has two children with her husband Wissem Rkhami.

Filmography

Television

Film

References

External links

Living people
1988 births
People from Rizal
Actresses from Rizal
Filipino television actresses
Filipino film actresses
21st-century Filipino actresses
GMA Network personalities
ABS-CBN personalities